Hankyu may refer to:
 Hankyu Corporation, a railway operator
 Hankyu Department Store
 Hankyu Braves, predecessors of Orix Buffaloes professional baseball team
 , a type of Yumi